Francisco de Vitoria  ( – 12 August 1546; also known as Francisco de Victoria) was a Spanish Roman Catholic philosopher, theologian, and jurist of Renaissance Spain. He is the founder of the tradition in philosophy known as the School of Salamanca, noted especially for his concept of just war and international law. He has in the past been described by scholars as the "father of international law", along with Alberico Gentili and Hugo Grotius, though some contemporary academics have suggested that such a description is anachronistic, since the concept of postmodern international law did not truly develop until much later. American jurist Arthur Nussbaum noted Vitoria's influence on international law as it pertained to the right to trade overseas. Later this was interpreted as "freedom of commerce".

Life
Vitoria was born  in Burgos and was raised in Burgos, the son of Pedro de Vitoria, of Alava, and Catalina de Compludo, both of noble families. As per modern scholarship, he had Jewish ancestry on his maternal side (the Compludos), being related to famous converts like Paul of Burgos and Alfonso de Cartagena. He became a Dominican in 1504, and was educated at the College Saint-Jacques in Paris, where he was influenced by the work of Desiderius Erasmus. He went on to teach theology from 1516 (under the influences of Pierre Crockaert and Thomas Cajetan). In 1522 he returned to Spain to teach theology at the college of Saint Gregory at Valladolid, where many young Dominicans were being trained for missionary work in the New World. In 1524, he was elected to the chair of theology at the University of Salamanca, where he was instrumental in promoting Thomism (the philosophy and theology of St. Thomas Aquinas). Francisco de Vitoria died on 12 August 1546 in Salamanca.

Positions on the status of Amerindians
A noted scholar, he was publicly consulted by Charles V, Holy Roman Emperor and King of Spain. He worked to limit the type of power the Spanish Empire imposed on the Native Peoples. He said, "The upshot of all the preceding is this, then, that the aborigines undoubtedly had true dominion in both public and private matters, just like Christians, and that neither their princes nor private persons could be despoiled of their property on the ground of their not being true owners." Vitoria denied that the native peoples could be understood as slaves by nature in Aristotelian terms. He adopted from Aquinas the Roman law concept of ius gentium ("the law of nations"). His defense of American Indians was based on a Scholastic understanding of the intrinsic dignity of man, a dignity he found being violated by Spain's policies in the New World.

In three lectures (relectiones) held between 1537 and 1539 Vitoria concluded that the Indians were rightful owners of their property and that their chiefs validly exercised jurisdiction over their tribes. This had already been the position of Palacios Rubios. Neither the pope nor Charles V had a rightful claim over Indian lives or property. No violent action could be taken against them, nor could their lands or property be seized, unless the Indians had caused harm or injury to the Spanish by violating the latter's lawful rights. In one of his lectures, "On the evangelization of unbelievers", Vitoria establishes that firstly, Indians, "should not be forcibly converted; but a second conclusion is that they may be forcibly restrained from hindering the missionaries of the faith, and from insulting Christ and Christians."

Throughout his lecture, "On the evangelization of unbelievers", Francisco de Vitoria employed the concept of what was considered Spanish Christian Universalism. Spanish Christian Universalism was the belief that all matters, arguments, and events were connected in the world, and Vitoria "visualized a universal society in the world into which any number of independent states might fit and foster relationships."

Francisco de Vitoria argued that forcible conversion of the Indians would, "cause great provocation and unrest among the heathen." Secondly, "instead of the benevolent and proper affection required for belief, forcible conversion would generate immense hate in them, and that in turn would give rise to pretense and hypocrisy."

Vitoria defended the Indians against other forms of harm which were being proposed, such as indirectly coercing the Indians into Christianity, "by taxes and levies by which they may be encouraged to become converts to the faith." He argued, "but as for tributes which cannot also be demanded of the faithful, I assert that they cannot be demanded of unbelievers with the intention of making them convert. Unbelievers cannot be deprived of their goods on the grounds of their unbelief, any more than other Christians, because they possess true right of ownership over their own property."

A supporter of the just war theory, in De iure belli Francisco pointed out that the underlying predicate conditions for a "just war" were "wholly lacking in the Indies". The only area where he saw justification for Spanish intervention in native affairs was to protect victims seized for human sacrifice, and because of the inherent human dignity of the victims themselves—whose rights were being violated and thus in need of defense.

Thomas E. Woods goes on to describe how some wished to argue that the natives lacked reason, but the evidence was against this because the natives had obvious customs, laws, and a form of government.

The Spaniards were in the practice of invoking in their American conquests the so-called "Requerimiento", a document read to the Indians before the commencement of any hostilities. The "Requerimiento", declared the universal authority of the Pope, and the authority the Spanish monarchs had received from the Pope over this part of the New World for the purpose of colonizing and evangelizing it. The Indians had to accept the sovereignty of the Spanish monarchs or be compelled to submit by force. Vitoria denied the legitimacy of this document.

Vitoria follows the arguments against Spanish rule of South-American territories by arguments that justify the Spanish practices, which are grounded in natural law. He asserts the right of the Spaniards to travel freely, and to trade, which includes searching for, mining, and exporting the abundant natural resources they find in South America. Unlawful resistance infringing upon the Spaniard's rights of travel, trade and exploitation, or infringing upon the Pope's right to spread Christianity, can be used to justify a "just war" of the Spaniards against the indigenous inhabitants, ending in Spanish rule over the territories in question.

Vitoria's works are known only from his lecture notes, as he has published nothing in his lifetime.  Nevertheless, his influence such as that on the Dutch legal philosopher Hugo Grotius was significant. Relectiones Theologicae was published posthumously several times (Lyon, 1557; Salamanca, 1565; Ingolstadt, 1580; Lyon, 1586 & 1587; Venice, 1626; Venice, 1640; Cologne & Frankfurt, 1696; and Madrid, 1765).

Francisco de Vitoria's writings have been interpreted by various scholars to support contrary policies. Antony Anghie and others argue that Vitoria's humanitarianism legitimized conquest.

Francisco de Vitoria presented strict interpretation of baptism of desire:When we postulate invincible ignorance on the subject of baptism or of the Christian faith, it does not follow that a person can be saved without baptism or the Christian faith. For the aborigines to whom no preaching of the faith or Christian religion has come will be damned for mortal sins or for idolatry, but not for the sin of unbelief. As St. Thomas says, however, if they do what in them lies, accompanied by a good life according to the law of nature, it is consistent with God’s providence that he will illuminate them regarding the name of Christ.

Works

Notes of his lectures from 1527 to 1540 were copied by students and published under the following titles:
 De potestate civili, 1528
 Del Homicidio, 1530
 De matrimonio, 1531
 De potestate ecclesiae I and II, 1532
 De Indis, 1532
 De Jure belli Hispanorum in barbaros, 1532
 De potestate papae et concilii, 1534
 Relectiones Theologicae, 1557
 Summa sacramentorum Ecclesiae, 1561
 De Indis et De Jure Belli (1917 translation of a large part of the Relectiones Theologicae)

Critical translations
 Francisco de Vitoria: Political Writings, translated by Jeremy Lawrance, ed. Jeremy Lawrance and Anthony Pagden, Cambridge University Press, 1991.
 Francisco de Vitoria: Relection on Homicide & Commentary on Summa theologiae IIa-IIae Q. 64 (Thomas Aquinas), translated with an Introduction and Notes by John P. Doyle, Milwaukee: Marquette University Press, 1997.

References

Sources
 Johannes Thumfart: Die Begründung der globalpolitischen Philosophie. Zu Francisco de Vitorias "relectio de indis recenter inventis" von 1539. Berlin 2009. (256 pp.)

External links
Francisco de Vitoria, De Indis (1532)

1480s births
1546 deaths
Spanish Dominicans
Catholic philosophers
16th-century Spanish Roman Catholic theologians
Scholastic philosophers
Academic staff of the University of Salamanca
International law scholars
Mercantilists
Spanish people of Jewish descent
16th-century Spanish philosophers
School of Salamanca
16th-century Spanish jurists